The first Jones government (10 December 2009 – 11 May 2011) was a continuation of the previous Labour–Plaid Cymru coalition government in Wales.

Following Rhodri Morgan's decision to retire, a leadership contest was held for the position of Welsh Labour Leader. The election was won by Carwyn Jones who was confirmed leader of Welsh Labour on 1 December 2009 and as First Minister on 9 December 2009 by the Welsh Assembly, Jones was officially sworn in the next day.

Cabinet

Junior ministers

See also 
Members of the 3rd National Assembly for Wales

References

Welsh governments
Ministries of Elizabeth II
Coalition governments of the United Kingdom
2009 establishments in Wales
2011 disestablishments in Wales
Cabinets established in 2009
Cabinets disestablished in 2011